The Mengenlehreuhr (German for "Set Theory Clock") or Berlin-Uhr ("Berlin Clock") is the first public clock in the world that tells the time by means of illuminated, coloured fields, for which it entered the Guinness Book of Records upon its installation on 17 June 1975. Commissioned by the Senate of Berlin and designed by Dieter Binninger, the original full-sized Mengenlehreuhr was originally located at the Kurfürstendamm on the corner with Uhlandstraße. After the Senate decommissioned it in 1995, the clock was relocated to a site in Budapester Straße in front of Europa-Center, where it stands today.

Time encoding
The Mengenlehreuhr consists of 24 lights which are divided into one circular blinking yellow light on top to denote the seconds, two top rows denoting the hours and two bottom rows denoting the minutes.

The clock is read from the top row to the bottom. The top row of four red fields denote five full hours each, alongside the second row, also of four red fields, which denote one full hour each, displaying the hour value in 24-hour format. The third row consists of eleven yellow-and-red fields, which denote five full minutes each (the red ones also denoting 15, 30 and 45 minutes past), and the bottom row has another four yellow fields, which mark one full minute each. The round yellow light on top blinks to denote odd- (when lit) or even-numbered (when unlit) seconds.

Given the photo of the clock at the top of the article as an example, two fields are lit in the first row (five hours multiplied by two, i.e. ten hours), but no fields are lit in the second row; therefore the hour value is 10. Six fields are lit in the third row (five minutes multiplied by six, i.e. thirty minutes), while the bottom row has one field on (plus one minute). Hence, the lights of the clock altogether tell the time as 10:31.

Kryptos 
This clock may be the key to the unsolved section of Kryptos, a sculpture at the CIA headquarters. After revealing that part of the deciphered text of the sculpture, in positions 64-69, reads "BERLIN", the sculptor, Jim Sanborn, gave The New York Times another clue in November 2014, that letters 70–74 in part 4 of the sculpture's code, which read "MZFPK", will become "CLOCK" when decoded, a direct reference to the Berlin Clock.  Sanborn further stated that in order to solve section 4, "You'd better delve into that particular clock".
However, Sanborn also said that, "There are several really interesting clocks in Berlin."

References

External links

Europa Center – Set Theory Clock
Aqua Phoenix: Set Theory Clock
Your local time in Berlin-Clock
 The actual time in the Berlin-Clock (Flash version)
JS and CSS realization of multiple Berlin clock time zones

German inventions
Set theory
Individual clocks
Clocks in Germany
Products introduced in 1975
1975 establishments in West Germany
Monuments and memorials in Berlin
1970s in West Berlin